A referendum on a peace pact for the five great powers was held in Czechoslovakia between 26 May and 17 June 1951. The referendum was in the form of a petition which voters could sign as being for or against. Over 99% signed as being for the proposal.

Results

References

1951 referendums
1951 elections in Czechoslovakia
Referendums in Czechoslovakia
June 1951 events in Europe